Mahmudnagar, also spelled Mahmoodnagar, is a village in Malihabad block of Lucknow district, Uttar Pradesh, India. As of 2011, its population is 2,390, in 394 households. It is the seat of a gram panchayat, which also includes the village of Nejabhari.

References 

Villages in Lucknow district